Rangelo Maria Janga (born 16 April 1992) is a Curaçaoan professional footballer who plays as a striker for Liga I club CFR Cluj and the Curaçao national team.

Club career
On 20 July 2018, Janga signed for Astana.

On 17 February 2020, Janga moved to Lugano on loan until 30 June 2020.

On 22 August 2020, Janga moved to NEC Nijmegen on a one-year loan deal.

On 31 August 2022, he moved to CFR Cluj.

International career
Born in the Netherlands to parents of Curaçaoan descent, Janga was called up, and debuted for the Curaçao national football team in a 1–0 loss against Barbados in March 2016.

Career statistics

Club

International

International goals
Scores and results list Curaçao's goal tally first.

Honours
Astana
 Kazakhstan Premier League: 2018, 2019
 Kazakhstan Super Cup: 2019

Apollon Limassol
 Cypriot First Division: 2021–22
 Cypriot Super Cup: 2022

Curaçao
 Caribbean Cup: 2017

References

External links
 Voetbal International profile 

1992 births
Living people
Association football forwards
Dutch people of Curaçao descent
Footballers from Rotterdam
Curaçao footballers
Dutch footballers
Eredivisie players
Eerste Divisie players
Belgian Pro League players
Cypriot First Division players
Cypriot Second Division players
Slovak Super Liga players
Swiss Super League players
Kazakhstan Premier League players
Liga I players
Willem II (football club) players
Excelsior Rotterdam players
Omonia Aradippou players
FC Dordrecht players
AS Trenčín players
K.A.A. Gent players
FC Astana players
FC Lugano players
NEC Nijmegen players
Apollon Limassol FC players
CFR Cluj players
Netherlands youth international footballers
Curaçao international footballers
Expatriate footballers in Cyprus
Expatriate footballers in Slovakia
Expatriate footballers in the Netherlands
Expatriate footballers in Kazakhstan
Expatriate footballers in Switzerland
Expatriate footballers in Belgium
Curaçao expatriate sportspeople in Cyprus
Curaçao expatriate sportspeople in Slovakia
Curaçao expatriate sportspeople in the Netherlands
Curaçao expatriate sportspeople in Kazakhstan
Curaçao expatriate sportspeople in Switzerland
Curaçao expatriate sportspeople in Belgium
Curaçao expatriate sportspeople in Romania
2017 CONCACAF Gold Cup players
Expatriate footballers in Romania